Serge Alexandrovich Tcherepnin (born 2 February 1941) is a Russian-American composer and electronic-instrument builder of Russian-Chinese parentage. Tcherepnin is noted for creating the Serge Modular synthesizer.

Biography
Serge Tcherepnin was born in Issy-les-Moulineaux, near Paris, the son of composer Aleksandr Nikolayevich Tcherepnin and grandson of composer Nikolai Nikolayevich Tcherepnin. His mother was Chinese pianist Lee Hsien Ming. An online biography of Alexander by Phillip Ramey, Vice-President of The Tcherepnin Society, includes a photograph of the family and shows Serge at a young age.

Serge had his first instruction in harmony with Nadia Boulanger and studied from 1958 to 1963 at Harvard University with Leon Kirchner and Billy Jim Layton. He became  a naturalized American citizen in 1960. In 1961 he studied at the Darmstadt Vacation Courses with Luigi Nono. He then studied in Europe with Pierre Boulez, Herbert Eimert, and Karlheinz Stockhausen. From 1968 to 1970 he participated in the Intermedia Program at New York University.

As an instructor at CalArts under Morton Subotnick, Serge was exposed to some of the earliest modular synthesizers designed by Don Buchla. This environment led Serge to develop his own eponymous modular synthesizer system called the Serge Modular. Electronics were manufactured by his own company Serge Modular Music Systems, which was officially founded in 1974 and occupied various locations in California, including Hollywood and an office on Haight Street in San Francisco. After closing the company in 1986, he returned to France.

As of 2018 Serge is once again involved in modular synthesis, having been appointed as "Chief Innovation Officer" of German synthesizer company Random*Source which has largely focused on recreating the Serge Modular system using modern manufacturing techniques.

Serge's brother Ivan Aleksandrovich Tcherepnin was also a well-known composer, and Ivan’s sons Stefan (born 1977) and Sergeï (born 1981) are also involved in composition.

Compositions
A selective list includes:
Inventions, for piano (1960) 
String Trio (1960)
String Quartet (1961)
Kaddish (text by Allen Ginsberg), for speaker, flute, oboe, clarinet, violin, piano, two percussionists (1962)
Figures-Grounds, for 7–77 instruments (1964) 
Morning After Piece, for saxophone and piano (1966)
Two Tapes (Giuseppe’s Background I–II), for 4-track tape (1966)
Two More Tapes (Addition and Subtraction), for 2-track tape (1966)
Quiet Day at Bach, for solo instrument and tape (1967)
Piece of Wood, multimedia piece for performers and actors (1967) 
Piece of Wood with Weeping Woman, multimedia piece for performers, women, stagehand, and tape (1967) 
Film, for Baschet instruments, traditional instruments, tape machines, four-channel amplification, ring modulators, theater, stage, and lights (1967) 
For Ilona Kabos, for piano (1968)
Definitive Death Music, for amplified saxophone and chamber ensemble (1968)
"Hat" for Joseph Beuys, for actor and tape (1968)
Paysages électroniques, film score (1977) 
Samba in Aviary, film score (1978)

Sources

Footnotes

1941 births
Harvard University alumni
Living people
20th-century classical composers
21st-century classical composers
American male classical composers
American classical composers
Benois family
American people of Chinese descent
Russian people of Chinese descent
Serge
Pupils of Karlheinz Stockhausen
21st-century American composers
20th-century American composers